Alexis Guérinot (born 3 March 1995) is a French lightweight rower. He won a gold medal at the 2016 World Rowing Championships in Rotterdam with the lightweight men's coxless pair.

References

1995 births
Living people
French male rowers
World Rowing Championships medalists for France
21st-century French people